Main Bhi Ladki Hoon is a 1964 Indian Hindi-language film. Directed by A. C. Tirulokchandar, the film stars Dharmendra and Meena Kumari. It is a remake of the Tamil film Naanum Oru Penn which itself was an adaptation on Sri Shailash Dey's Bengali play Bodhu.

Plot 
Rajni, a dusky, uneducated girl, is deceptively married off to Ram, son of a wealthy father. Although loved by all, a conniving relative sows the seeds of suspicion in the minds of the family members.

Cast 
 Dharmendra as Ram
 Meena Kumari as Rajni
 Balraj Sahani as Ganga
 Om Prakash as Dindayal "Raja"
 A. V. M. Rajan as Balram
 Pushpalatha as Chanda
 Bhagwan Dada as T. B.
 Manorama as Mrs. Dindayal
 S. V. Ranga Rao as Zamindar
 Mohan Choti as Lallu
 Kammo as Bhagwanti
 Umesh Sharma as Mohan

Soundtrack 
The music director of this movie is Chitragupt. The songs "Chanda Se Hoga Woh Pyara" and "Krishna, O Kaale Krishna" have the same tune as the Tamil and the Telugu version.

References

External links 
 

1964 films
1960s Hindi-language films
Films directed by A. C. Tirulokchandar
Films scored by Chitragupta
Hindi remakes of Tamil films